Ampefy is a municipality in Madagascar. It belongs to the district of Soavinandriana, which is a part of Itasy Region. The population of the commune was 19,949 in 2018.

Primary and junior level secondary education are available in town. The majority 91.5% of the population of the commune are farmers.  The most important crops are beans and vegetables; also maize is an important agricultural product. Industry and services provide employment for 0.5% and 1% of the population, respectively. Additionally fishing employs 7% of the population.

Roads
It is localized on the National Road 43.

Rivers
The Lily River that forms also the Lily falls near Ampefy.

References

Populated places in Itasy Region